Phaedra Nicolaidis is an Australian actress, who has appeared in television, film and theatre roles. Phaedra graduated from Australia's National Institute of Dramatic Art (NIDA) with a degree in Performing Arts (Acting) in 2004.

Television Credits
 Outriders as Mel
 HeadLand as director

Film Credits
 Hey Sista! (2002) as Lisa
 Me Myself I as Self Defence Girl

External links

Australian people of Greek descent
Australian television actresses
Living people
Year of birth missing (living people)